The 2020 New Mexico Bowl was a college football bowl game played on December 24, 2020, at Toyota Stadium in Frisco, Texas, with kickoff at 3:30 p.m. EST (2:30 p.m. local CST) on ESPN. It was the 15th edition of the New Mexico Bowl, and was one of the 2020–21 bowl games concluding the 2020 FBS football season.

When the schedule for 2020–21 bowl games was announced in late October, a site for the New Mexico Bowl was not specified, due to health concerns related to the COVID-19 pandemic; it was also reported that contingency plans could result in the bowl being played in Texas. All prior editions of the bowl were played at Dreamstyle Stadium in Albuquerque, New Mexico. On November 24, ESPN Events announced that the bowl would be played at Toyota Stadium in Frisco, Texas.

Teams
Based on conference tie-ins, the bowl was expected to feature teams from Conference USA (C-USA) and the Mountain West Conference. The matchup was announced on December 13, with the Houston Cougars from the American Athletic Conference (AAC or "The American") facing the Hawaii Rainbow Warriors from Mountain West. This was their second meeting, coming almost exactly 17 years after the 2003 Hawaii Bowl, a triple-overtime 54–48 win by Hawaii. That game ended with fighting between the teams, as players got into shouting matches and punches were thrown.

Hawaii

Hawaii entered the bowl with a record of 4–4, having only played conference games. Hawaii's most recent bowl game appearance in the contiguous United States had been the 2008 Sugar Bowl. From 2008 through 2019, the program played in five editions of the Hawaii Bowl.

Houston

Houston entered the bowl with an overall record of 3–4 (3–3 in conference games). They became one of a limited number of teams to enter a bowl game with a losing record.

Game summary

Statistics

See also
 2020 Frisco Bowl, held at the same venue

References

External links

Game statistics at statbroadcast.com

New Mexico Bowl
New Mexico Bowl
Hawaii Rainbow Warriors football bowl games
Houston Cougars football bowl games
New Mexico Bowl
New Mexico Bowl